Kaa-Khem (Kaa-Xem) is an urban locality (an urban-type settlement) in the  Tuva Republic, Russia. It is the administrative center of Kyzylsky District. As of the 2010 census, the locality had a population of 15,044. The town was founded in 1975 with the opening of an industrial plant.

References

Cities and towns in Tuva